The  was an 8.0-kilometer long railway line of Japanese National Railways between Kakogawa and Takasago all within Hyōgo Prefecture, Japan. This line existed between 1913 and 1984.

History
The  opened the line between Kakogawachō and Takasagoguchi (2.9 miles) on December 1, 1913. The line was extended 1.9 miles to Takasagoura on September 25, 1914 completing the 4.8-mile line. The 0.9-mile section between Takasago and Takasagoura ceased passenger service in 1921.

At the time of nationalization, Kakogawachō Station was merged to JGR Kakogawa Station and Takasagoura Station was renamed Takasagokō Station.

Japanese National Railways (JNR) included the line in the list of specified local lines to be closed, and closed it for freight service (completely closing the freight-only Takasago–Takasagokō section) on February 1, 1984 and for passenger service on December 1, 1984.

Stations
As of 1984, the line had seven stations:

Passengers
The fares of Takasago Line were cheap, but Takasago Line has few trains, so it was not comfortable. Because of that, most of passengers were high school students.

References

Rail transport in Hyōgo Prefecture
Japanese National Railways
Closed railway lines
Railway lines closed in 1984